The Castle is a 1994 film directed by Aleksei Balabanov. It is the second notable screen version of Kafka’s unfinished novel The Castle. It tells of an individual desperately trying to preserve his identity while struggling against sinister and invisible bureaucrats who rule the village from inside the titular castle. The picture is noted for costumes/sets design in bruegelian style, it won Best Art Direction and Best Costumes at the 1994 Nika Awards.

Cast 
 Nikolay Stotsky – Zemlemer
 Svetlana Pismichenko – Frida
 Viktor Sukhorukov – Zemlemer's assistant Jeremiah
 Anwar Libabov – Zemlemer's assistant Arthur
 Igor Shibanov – Brunswick
 Aleksei German – Clamm
 Bolot Beyshenaliyev – village headman
 Olga Antonova – Innkeeper

References

External links 
 

1994 films
Russian drama films
1990s Russian-language films
Films based on works by Franz Kafka
Films directed by Aleksei Balabanov
Films based on Czech novels
1994 drama films
Films set in castles
Lenfilm films